Jesper Ingevald Crusebjörn (24 July 1843 – 24 June 1904) was a Swedish politician and officer of the Swedish Army, eventually attaining the rank of lieutenant general.

Life
He was the son of Frans Crusebjörn and Lovisa Fougt. He became an officer in the Swedish Army in 1863 and was attached to the general staff and teacher at the Swedish National War College from 1872 to 1882. By 1883 he had been promoted to major and in 1888 he was promoted to lieutenant-colonel and took charge of Jämtland Ranger Corps (I 23). He was promoted again three years later to colonel. At the same time he became county governor of Västerbotten County. Making major general by 1899, he was also appointed Minister for War, a position he held from 1899 to 1903, during which he enforced the construction of Boden Fortress and was promoted to lieutenant general (1901). He was also a member of the Royal Swedish Academy of War Sciences.

Private life 
He married Augusta Bahrman in 1873.

His daughter Cecilia Crusebjörn (1878–1966), married Major Wiktor Unander on 5 May 1905 in Vienna, Austria.

References 

1843 births
1904 deaths
People from Grödinge
Swedish Army lieutenant generals
Swedish Ministers for Defence
Members of the Andra kammaren
Members of the Första kammaren
Swedish nobility
Swedish people of German descent
Governors of Västerbotten County
Members of the Royal Swedish Academy of War Sciences